Perbál is a village in Pest county, Budapest metropolitan area, Hungary. It has a population of 2,233 (2007).

References

Populated places in Pest County
Hungarian German communities